Thomas Pangborn (1870 – 1926) was an English professional footballer who played as a winger.

Pangborn was signed by Tottenham in April 1900, in the 1900–01 season he recorded just two Southern League appearances. He joined Reading in January 1901.

References

1870 births
1926 deaths
Footballers from Birmingham, West Midlands
English footballers
Association football wingers
Warwick County F.C. players
Walsall F.C. players
Worcester Rovers F.C. players
West Bromwich Albion F.C. players
Ashton North End F.C. players
Bury F.C. players
Grimsby Town F.C. players
Gillingham F.C. players
Tottenham Hotspur F.C. players
Reading F.C. players
Watford F.C. players
English Football League players